Tweespruit is a small dairy farming town in the Free State province of South Africa. The town lies 27km east of Thaba Nchu and 47km north of Hobhouse.

History
Afrikaans for "two creeks", the name refers to the town’s location at the confluence of two small rivers.

The town started as an experimental farm set up on an old British Boer War settlement which was between two creeks, hence the name.

Notable people from Tweespruit
 Father Frans Claerhout, artist and priest at Tweespruit mission station.
 Michael Anthony (Pez) Parsonson, SAAF fighter pilot.

Gallery

References 

Populated places in the Mantsopa Local Municipality